Personae is a live album by bassist Jonas Hellborg, released on 26 February 2002 through Bardo Records. The album continues the series of live recordings by the trio of Hellborg, guitarist Shawn Lane, and drummer Jeff Sipe.

Critical reception

Marked by individual technical virtuosity and collective harmony of expression, the album escorts the listener through a variety of styles, including rock and funk music, in which "the key ingredient is listening to others" "building on it, extending it, taking it someplace new before handing it back". It is this multifaceted process of personal and collective musical communication that explains the title of Personae.

Track listing

Personnel

Jonas Hellborg – bass, production
Shawn Lane – guitar
Jeff Sipe – drums
Scud Noonan – mixing

References

External links
In Review: Hellborg/Lane/Sipe "Personae" at Guitar Nine Records

Jonas Hellborg albums
Shawn Lane albums
2002 live albums